The fourth season of the fantasy drama television series Game of Thrones premiered in the United States on HBO on April 6, 2014, and concluded on June 15, 2014. It was broadcast on Sunday at 9:00 pm in the United States, consisting of 10 episodes, each running approximately 50–60 minutes. The season is adapted primarily from the second half of A Storm of Swords, along with elements of A Feast for Crows and A Dance with Dragons, all novels from the A Song of Ice and Fire series by George R. R. Martin. The series is adapted for television by David Benioff and D. B. Weiss. HBO ordered the fourth season on April 2, 2013, which began filming in July 2013. The season was filmed primarily in Ireland, Northern Ireland and Croatia. 

The story takes place in a fictional world, primarily upon a continent called Westeros, with one storyline occurring on another continent to the east, Essos. After the death of Robb Stark at The Red Wedding, all three remaining kings in Westeros believe they have a claim to the Iron Throne. King Joffrey is killed by poison at his wedding, and his uncle Tyrion is blamed; young Tommen Baratheon is crowned king. Meanwhile, Sansa Stark escapes King's Landing. At the Wall, Jon Snow and the Night's Watch, badly outnumbered, begin a grim battle against 100,000 Wildlings, but Stannis's army sweeps in to demand the Wildlings' surrender. Bran Stark's visions lead him far beyond the Wall to the north, where he meets the Three-Eyed Raven. Daenerys Targaryen captures Meereen and decides to rule as queen of Slaver's Bay until she can permanently defeat the slavers; she finds ruling more difficult than conquering. She reluctantly chains up her growing dragons, who have become difficult to control. Arya Stark crisscrosses Westeros accompanied by the Hound, but sails alone to Braavos on Essos to end the season.

Game of Thrones features a large ensemble cast, including Peter Dinklage, Nikolaj Coster-Waldau, Lena Headey, Emilia Clarke and Kit Harington. The season introduced a number of new cast members, including Pedro Pascal, Indira Varma, Michiel Huisman and Dean-Charles Chapman.

Critics praised the show's production values and cast, with specific accolades for Dinklage's portrayal of Tyrion Lannister. Viewership yet again rose compared to the previous season. It won 4 of the 19 Emmy Awards for which it was nominated.

Episodes

Cast

Main cast 

 Peter Dinklage as Tyrion Lannister
 Nikolaj Coster-Waldau as Jaime Lannister
 Lena Headey as Cersei Lannister
 Emilia Clarke as Daenerys Targaryen
 Kit Harington as Jon Snow
 Charles Dance as Tywin Lannister
 Natalie Dormer as Margaery Tyrell
 Jack Gleeson as Joffrey Baratheon
 Sophie Turner as Sansa Stark
 Maisie Williams as Arya Stark
 John Bradley as Samwell Tarly
 Rose Leslie as Ygritte
 Kristofer Hivju as Tormund Giantsbane
 Rory McCann as Sandor "The Hound" Clegane

 Gwendoline Christie as Brienne of Tarth
 Jerome Flynn as Bronn
 Sibel Kekilli as Shae
 Iain Glen as Jorah Mormont
 Liam Cunningham as Davos Seaworth
 Stephen Dillane as Stannis Baratheon
 Carice van Houten as Melisandre
 Alfie Allen as Theon Greyjoy / "Reek"
 Isaac Hempstead Wright as Bran Stark
 Iwan Rheon as Ramsay Snow / Ramsay Bolton
 Conleth Hill as Varys
 Aidan Gillen as Petyr "Littlefinger" Baelish
 Hannah Murray as Gilly

Guest cast
The recurring actors listed here are those who appeared in season 4. They are listed by the region in which they first appear:

At and beyond the Wall
 Owen Teale as Alliser Thorne
 Peter Vaughan as Maester Aemon
 Brian Fortune as Othell Yarwyck
 Dominic Carter as Janos Slynt
 Ben Crompton as Eddison Tollett
 Noah Taylor as Locke
 Mark Stanley as Grenn
 Josef Altin as Pypar
 Luke Barnes as Rast
 Burn Gorman as Karl Tanner
 Brenock O'Connor as Olly
 Lu Corfield as the Mole's Town madam
 Lois Winstone as a Mole's Town prostitute
 Ciarán Hinds as Mance Rayder
 Yuri Kolokolnikov as Styr
 Ian Whyte as Dongo
 Joseph Gatt as a Thenn warg
 Deirdre Monaghan as Morag
 Jane McGrath as Sissy
 Thomas Brodie-Sangster as Jojen Reed
 Ellie Kendrick as Meera Reed
 Kristian Nairn as Hodor
 Struan Rodger as the Three-Eyed Raven
 Octavia Alexandru as Leaf
 Richard Brake as the Night King
 Ross Mullan as White Walkers

In the North
 Michael McElhatton as Roose Bolton
 Elizabeth Webster as Walda Bolton
 Gemma Whelan as Yara Greyjoy
 Charlotte Hope as Myranda

In the Vale
 Lino Facioli as Robin Arryn
 Kate Dickie as Lysa Arryn
 Rupert Vansittart as Yohn Royce
 Alisdair Simpson as Donnel Waynwood

In King's Landing
 Dean-Charles Chapman as Tommen Baratheon
 Julian Glover as Grand Maester Pycelle
 Roger Ashton-Griffiths as Mace Tyrell
 Finn Jones as Loras Tyrell
 Diana Rigg as Olenna Tyrell
 Pedro Pascal as Oberyn Martell
 Indira Varma as Ellaria Sand
 Ian Beattie as Meryn Trant
 Hafþór Júlíus Björnsson as Gregor Clegane
 Daniel Portman as Podrick Payne
 Tony Way as Dontos Hollard
 Paul Bentley as the High Septon
 Anton Lesser as Qyburn
 Will Tudor as Olyvar
 Josephine Gillan as Marei
 Pixie Le Knot as Kayla

On Dragonstone
 Tara Fitzgerald as Selyse Florent
 Kerry Ingram as Shireen Baratheon

In the Riverlands
 Gary Oliver as Ternesio Terys
 Andy Kellegher as Polliver
 Andy Beckwith as Rorge
 Gerard Jordan as Biter
 Ben Hawkey as Hot Pie

In Braavos
 Mark Gatiss as Tycho Nestoris
 Lucian Msamati as Salladhor Saan
 Sarine Sofair as Lhara

In Slaver's Bay
 Michiel Huisman as Daario Naharis
 Ian McElhinney as Barristan Selmy
 Nathalie Emmanuel as Missandei
 Jacob Anderson as Grey Worm
 Joel Fry as Hizdahr zo Loraq
 Reece Noi as Mossador

Production
On April 2, 2013, HBO announced it had renewed the series for a fourth season, to consist of 10 episodes.

Crew
David Benioff and D. B. Weiss serve as main writers and showrunners for the fourth season. They co-wrote seven out of ten episodes. The remaining three episodes were written by Bryan Cogman (two episodes), and the author of A Song of Ice and Fire, George R. R. Martin (one episode).

Benioff and Weiss co-directed the season premiere after making their directorial debut in season 3, although only Weiss is credited as Benioff received credit for their previous directed episode; Alex Graves, who directed two episodes in season 3, returned and directed episodes 2, 3, 8 and 10; Michelle MacLaren, who also directed two episodes in season 3, returned to direct episodes 4 and 5; former series cinematographer Alik Sakharov, who directed in seasons 2 and 3, returned to direct episodes 6 and 7; and Neil Marshall directed episode 9 after previously directing "Blackwater", the ninth episode of season 2.

Casting

The fourth season adds previously recurring actors Gwendoline Christie (Brienne of Tarth), Iwan Rheon (Ramsay Snow), Kristofer Hivju (Tormund Giantsbane) and Hannah Murray (Gilly) to the series' main cast.  Iain Glen's credit is moved last in the rotation and given the "With" moniker.

Prince Oberyn Martell, nicknamed "The Red Viper", is played by Chilean-American actor Pedro Pascal. "This was a tough one", said showrunners David Benioff and Dan Weiss about the casting. "The Red Viper is sexy and charming, yet believably dangerous; intensely likable, yet driven by hate. The boys love him, the girls love him, and he loves them all back. Unless your last name is Lannister. We found a fellow who can handle the job description and make it seem effortless. He wasn't easy to find and he won't be easy to stop". Martin commented on the casting by saying: "I wasn't present for Pedro Pascal's audition, but I understand that he really killed it with his reading. And since his casting was announced, the producer of another TV show on which he appeared recently has written me to say how terrific Pascal is, and to congratulate us on the casting. So I suspect that he will turn out to be a wonderful Red Viper". Actress Indira Varma was cast as Ellaria Sand, Prince Oberyn's paramour.

Roger Ashton-Griffiths joins the cast in the role of Mace Tyrell. "The lord oaf of Highgarden", as his mother describes him, is otherwise known as father to Margaery and Loras. His casting was confirmed by George R. R. Martin, who introduced the actor as the solution to a riddle he'd set fans with the following message, "Yes, it's the fine British character actor Roger Ashton-Griffiths, who has been cast in the role of Mace Tyrell, son to the Queen of Thorns, and father of Loras and Margaery".

Mark Gatiss plays Tycho Nestoris, a representative of the Iron Bank of Braavos, to whom the Iron Throne owes millions in borrowed gold. The role of Hizdahr zo Loraq is played by young British actor Joel Fry. Hizdahr is the young scion of an ancient Meereenese family who crosses paths with Daenerys Targaryen in Meereen. Elizabeth Webster was cast as Fat Walda Frey. Walda Frey is a granddaughter of Lord Walder Frey. She is the new wife of Roose Bolton, the Lord of the Dreadfort. During the wedding feast of Edmure Tully and Roslin Frey, Lord Bolton recounts to Catelyn Stark and Ser Brynden "Blackfish" Tully how Lord Walder Frey proposed him to marry one of his granddaughters and offered her weight in silver as dowry. Lord Bolton then adds he chose the fattest bride available and she has made him very rich.
Paola Dionisotti and Rupert Vansittart were cast as Lady Anya Waynwood and Bronze Yohn Royce. They are the heads of House Waynwood and House Royce of Runestone: two powerful vassal houses of House Arryn. Yuri Kolokolnikov plays Styr: One of Mance Rayder's lieutenants and the Magnar – the name of the first ever Lord of Thenn which is now a title – of the Thenn people, a wildling clan. Two mysterious characters from Bran's storyline have also been cast: the Three-Eyed Raven, who is played by Struan Rodger, and a Child of the Forest, played by Octavia Alexandru.

Roles that were recast for season 4 include Michiel Huisman as Daario Naharis. Huisman replaces Ed Skrein, who portrayed the character in season 3. Dean-Charles Chapman plays the role of Tommen Baratheon, King Joffrey's younger brother. Tommen was played by Callum Wharry in seasons 1 and 2. Chapman appeared as Martyn Lannister in two episodes of season 3 ("Walk of Punishment" and "Kissed by Fire"). Hafþór Júlíus Björnsson was cast as Ser Gregor Clegane, called "The Mountain". Hafþór replaces Ian Whyte, who portrayed the character in season 2.

After an absence of at least a season, Owen Teale returns as Alliser Thorne, Kate Dickie as Lysa Arryn, Dominic Carter as Janos Slynt, Tony Way as Dontos Hollard, Andy Beckwith as Rorge, Gerard Jordan as Biter, Andy Kellegher as Polliver, Lino Facioli as Robin Arryn and Brian Fortune as Othell Yarwyck.

Filming
Filming for the season began on July 8, 2013, in Northern Ireland. The series also returned to Iceland and Dubrovnik for filming.
New locations in Croatia include Diocletian's Palace in Split, Klis Fortress north of Split, Perun quarry east of Split, Mosor mountain, and Baška Voda further down to the south. In the commentary for episode 2, "The Lion and the Rose," the showrunners revealed that parts of Joffrey's death scene had been filmed in California. The Thingvellir National Park in Iceland was used as the location for the fight between Brienne and The Hound, and the Þórufoss waterfall was the background for Drogon's attack on a herd of goats in episode 6.

Filming for the season lasted 136 days and was completed on November 21, 2013.

Music

The Icelandic post-rock band Sigur Rós appears in the second episode, as a group of musicians serenading the royal couple at their wedding reception with "The Rains of Castamere." This continues the series's tradition of employing noted indie bands, begun in season 2 with The National and continued in season 3 with The Hold Steady.

The soundtrack for the season was released digitally on June 10, 2014, and on CD on July 1, 2014.

Reception

Critical response

The review aggregator website Metacritic gave season 4 a score of 94 out of 100 based on 29 reviews, signifying "universal acclaim". On Rotten Tomatoes, the fourth season has a 97% approval rating from 45 critics with an average rating of 8.89 out of 10. The site's critical consensus reads, "Game of Thrones continues to be one of the best shows on TV, combining meticulously-plotted character arcs with the spectacular design of the Seven Kingdoms."

Variety praised the "spectacular cast" and "the sweeping and diverse backdrops" of the season, while Andy Greenwald of Grantland specifically highlighted its "stately pace". Newsday gave it a score of 'A+' and stated that it was "still TV's best -- dive in while the water's warm. Winter is coming, after all." Slant Magazine gave the season 3.5 out of 4 and stated, "Season four feels entirely liberated from the show's own extensive mythology and now moves with thrilling fury and purpose." The Hollywood Reporter gave the season a positive review and stated, "The consistent excellence in Game of Thrones is truly something to behold." The emotional weight, action sequences, performances, visual storytelling and narrative payoff was praised by James Poniewozik of Time and Hank Stuever of The Washington Post.

The A.V. Club gave it a score of 'A−' and stated, "Game Of Thrones was and is an astonishing achievement-a vast web of world-building and map-reading and politicking in made-up languages, while still relying on the close-up camera shot of a single actor's face to draw the most drama out of a scene." Maureen Ryan of HuffPost gave the season a positive review and stated, "To me, the excitement of Game of Thrones, and the hope, exists in the margins, where the smartest characters often lurk." TheWrap termed it a "gorgeous spectacle" and said that "aside from the Star Wars saga, I can't think of any on-screen story that creates such a vast, believable world out of imagination." RogerEbert.com stated that it was "one of the best shows of the last several years feels as creatively vital as ever."

The Boston Globe praised the actors, who "rise to that challenge, whether playing opposite one person or a multitude of extras." USA Today gave the season a positive review and stated, "HBO's lavishly and expertly produced fantasy returns with a lightning-fast opener that skillfully, sometimes amusingly, and eventually violently resets the characters, putting them in place for the season to come." The New York Times praised "its 78 subplots (rough estimate)" that "tend to unfold along user-friendly genre lines." Empire gave the season 5 out of 5 and stated that "HBO's hard-R fantasy series continues to be must-see TV."

The only major publication to give the season a negative review was IndieWire, who gave it a score of 'C+' and stated, "Game of Thrones is a slog through fluctuating politics and random instances of gore with only brief moments of true excitement, when you can distinguish good from evil."

The episodes "The Lion and the Rose", "The Laws of Gods and Men", "The Mountain and the Viper" and "The Children" in particular were singled out as being among the best episodes of the series. However, the third episode attracted criticism for the inclusion of a scene in which Jaime Lannister appears to be raping his sister and lover Cersei in the Great Sept of Baelor. In the source novel, Cersei verbally consents to the sexual encounter, but does not in the television portrayal. The final episode was also criticized for the omission of the events of the epilogue of A Storm of Swords which was expected by fans to be the final scene.

Ratings

Season 4 obtained the strongest viewer numbers of all seasons aired up until that point, with a series high of 7.20 million viewers of the first airing of the seventh episode. With its fourth season, Game of Thrones has become the most-watched HBO series in history (surpassing the fourth season of The Sopranos which had a gross audience of 18.2 million viewers), averaging 18.4 million viewers across multiple platforms, including live viewing, encores, DVR views, HBO GO and On Demand views.

Accolades

For the 30th TCA Awards, the series was nominated for Outstanding Achievement in Drama and Program of the Year. For the 4th Critics' Choice Television Awards, the series was nominated for Best Drama Series and Diana Rigg received a nomination for Best Guest Performer in a Drama Series. For the 66th Primetime Emmy Awards, the series received 19 nominations, including Outstanding Drama Series, Peter Dinklage for Outstanding Supporting Actor in a Drama Series, Lena Headey for Outstanding Supporting Actress in a Drama Series, Diana Rigg for Outstanding Guest Actress in a Drama Series, David Benioff and D. B. Weiss for Outstanding Writing for a Drama Series for "The Children", and Neil Marshall for Outstanding Directing for a Drama Series for "The Watchers on the Wall". For the 67th Writers Guild of America Awards, the series was nominated for Best Drama Series and George R. R. Martin was nominated for Best Episodic Drama for "The Lion and the Rose". For the 21st Screen Actors Guild Awards, the cast was nominated for Best Drama Ensemble, Peter Dinklage was nominated for Best Drama Actor, and the series won for Best Stunt Team. For the 72nd Golden Globe Awards, the series was nominated for Best Television Series – Drama. For the 67th Directors Guild of America Awards, Alex Graves was nominated for Outstanding Directing – Drama Series for the episode "The Children".

Release

Home media

IMAX
Between January 30 and February 5, 2015, the last two episodes of season four were shown in 205 IMAX theaters in the U.S. Game of Thrones is the first TV series released in this format. The show earned $686,000 in its opening day at the box office and $1.5 million during its opening weekend. The one-week release grossed $1,896,092.

Copyright infringement
The fourth season of Game of Thrones was the most-pirated TV series in 2014.

References

External links
  – official US site
  – official UK site
 Game of Thrones – The Viewers Guide on HBO.com
 Making Game of Thrones on HBO.com
 
 

2014 American television seasons
Season 4